Richard Brett Campbell (born October 17, 1981) is an American former professional baseball pitcher. He played in Major League Baseball (MLB) for the Washington Nationals.

Career
Campbell was drafted by the Montreal Expos in the 34th round of the 2004 amateur draft. He began the 2004 season playing for their rookie league affiliate, the GCL Expos. During the season, he was promoted to the Class A Vermont Expos and then to the Class A-Advanced Brevard County Manatees.

The Expos were relocated to Washington D.C. for the 2005 season, becoming the Washington Nationals. During the first year as a part of the new Nationals association, he played for the Class A Savannah Sand Gnats before being promoted to the A-Advanced Potomac Nationals. He started 2006 with the Potomac Nationals and was then promoted to the Double-A Harrisburg Senators and then the Triple-A New Orleans Zephyrs. He received a September call-up to the major league Nationals, making is big league debut on September 7, 2006. In 2007, he returned to Double-A Harrisburg.

After the 2007 season, he was selected by the Milwaukee Brewers in the Rule 5 Draft (Triple-A Phase), but was released before the start of the 2008 season.

Following his playing career, he became a scout in the Texas Rangers organization.

See also
Rule 5 draft results

References

External links

1981 births
Living people
Baseball players from Atlanta
Major League Baseball pitchers
Washington Nationals players
Wallace State Lions baseball players
Georgia Bulldogs baseball players
Kennesaw State Owls baseball players
Gulf Coast Expos players
Brevard County Manatees players
Vermont Expos players
Savannah Sand Gnats players
Potomac Nationals players
New Orleans Zephyrs players
Harrisburg Senators players
Texas Rangers scouts